Lo chiamavano Bulldozer, also known as They Called Him Bulldozer or Bulldozer is a 1978 Italian action-comedy film directed by Michele Lupo.

Plot 
Bulldozer is a sailor and a retired American football superstar; landed by accident in the port of Livorno, he is involved in a sport challenge.

Cast 
 Bud Spencer: Bulldozer
 Raimund Harmstorf: Serg. Kempfer
 Joe Bugner: Alberto Sarticoli Orso
 Ottaviano Dell'Acqua: Gerry
 René Kolldehoff: The colonel
 Gigi Reder: Curatolo
 Luigi Bonos: The mechanic

References

External links

1978 films
Italian sports comedy films
Films directed by Michele Lupo
Films scored by Guido & Maurizio De Angelis
1970s sports comedy films
1978 comedy films
1970s Italian films